Nandhi is a 2011 Indian Tamil-language action masala film written and directed by Tamilvannan and produced by Dinesh Karthik. The film stars Akhil, Sanusha, and Singampuli. The music was composed by Bharadwaj with editing by V. T. Vijayan and cinematography by M. P. Ratheesh. The film was released on 11 February 2011.

Cast

Soundtrack
Director Tamilvannan worked with composer Yuvan Shankar Raja for his first two films, Kalvanin Kadhali and Machakaaran, which were hits. For Nandhi, however, the music director was Bharadwaj.

References

2011 films
2010s Tamil-language films
Films scored by Bharadwaj (composer)